Tyersal is a village  east of Bradford and  west of Leeds and has a population of 2,605 according to Bradford Community Statistics Project.

The district is split between both City of Bradford metropolitan borough and the City of Leeds metropolitan borough, with east Tyersal sitting in the Pudsey ward of Leeds City Council.

Tyersal joined Bradford in 1882 and part of it became part of the Leeds metropolitan district in 1974.

Shops 
On Tyersal Road there are six shops, including a Newsagents, Pharmacy, Sandwich shop, mortgage brokers and a Takeaway.

Transport 
Currently there is the 630 service, operated by First Bradford, which terminates at the top. Service 508 from Leeds to Halifax operated also by First Bradford, is half-hourly along Dick Lane at the bottom of Tyersal. Previously, service 66 (operated by First Leeds and then Centrebus) provided buses to Leeds and back (there were four services daily), although 2010 saw this service withdrawn, and now service 508 is the only remaining bus to Leeds.

New Pudsey railway station is around one and a half miles north-east of the village by road, where services are operated by Northern to Manchester Victoria, Blackpool North, Wakefield Westgate, York and Selby.

Pubs and clubs 

 Tyersal Residents Association Community Centre
 The Quarry Gap public house (Now Quarry Cafe)
 Tyersal Park Bowling Club

Crown Green bowling club plays in the Bradford Crown Green Bowling Association.

See also
Listed buildings in Pudsey

External links 
 Tyersal Action Group - Neighbourhood Action Plan
  The Ancient Parish of Calverley at GENUKI: Tyersal, previously spelled "Tyresall", was in this parish

Areas of Bradford
Places in Leeds
Pudsey